Amani Research Institute is a research institute located at Amani, in the Muheza District, on the Western Usambara Mountains of the northeastern region in present day Tanzania. The mountains form part of the Eastern Arc Mountains, which stretch from Kenya through Tanzania, and are covered by tropical cloud forests that have endured a long period of unique evolutionary endemism.

.

History

The forerunner of the Amani Institute was an agricultural test station at Kwai, which had been set up in the Usambara since 1896. "Although Amani was the most famous of Germany's colonial research stations, representing a 2-million-mark investment, it was only one of several German agricultural stations in the northern region. Another, named Kwai farm and located in the nearby West Usambaras, preceded Amani as the colony's chief center for agricultural and livestock experiments. Kwai lacked Amani's international reputation, but it nonetheless held a prominent place in the minds of the Africans who lived in its shadow."

The Kwai experimental station soon became state owned, and was finally sold to the long-term lease-holder, Ludwig Illich. 

As early as 1890, Richard Hindorf had promoted the idea of a research station in German East Africa along the models of other similar stations in British and Dutch colonies.

Hindorf was also a co-founder of the Colonial Economic Committee (German: Kolonial-wirtschaftliches Komitee), which passed the resolution in June 1898, in Berlin, "to send a submission to the Reich Chancellor that there is set for... German East Africa in 1899 a sum of 100,000 Marks with the purpose of the setting up and operation of a research station for tropical cultures in Usambara." The submission was justified by the appended articles of Dr Hindorf: “A research station for tropical cultures in Usambara" and Prof. Dr. Otto Warburg: “The need for an experimental station for tropical crops in Usambara and its cost".

With the assistance of Franz Stuhlmann, the naturalist and zoologist, the project soon got off the ground and the Amani Institute was founded in September 1902, in the East Usambara mountains situated in the hinterland of the port city of Tanga at Stuhlmann's suggestion. Work began in 1903 and was directed by the botanist, Albrecht Zimmermann, before Karl Braun took over as head, only to be succeeded again by Zimmermann. Zimmermann and his staff worked in Amani until 1920, when the British mandated government dismissed them. From 1905 to the end of 1906, Franz Stuhlmann was the director in person at Amani.

The Institute, starting out as a biological-agricultural research centre, came to be known as the Amani Biological-Agricultural Institute (German: Biologisch-Landwirtschaftliche Institut Amani). It quickly expanded into other areas of research in the following years and soon became a 'tropical scientific institute superior to anything in the British colonies and protectorates and comparable with Pusa in India or the  Dutch establishment at Buitenzorg in Java."<ref>Report of the East Africa Commission, Cmd. 2387 (1925), p. 86.</ref>

Botanical work

Stuhlmann introduced the first systematic planting of cinchona bark trees in East Africa, which was to be used for the production of quinine against malaria. He also directed the planting of hundreds of camphor trees in the Usambara from seeds sent to him by Adolf Engler, the renowned plant taxonomist at the then Royal Botanical Museum, Berlin and a professor at the University of Berlin, who had obtained them from Japan. Adolf Engler, in 1903. provided 859 specimens of plants to the Institute, including commercially important tropical plants, and 208 specimens of other tropical plants. 

Stuhlmann brought Albrecht Zimmermann, who had worked in Buitenzorg since 1896, to Amani for the purpose of botanical research. He became eventually director of the Institute in 1911. Zimmermann was primarily known as a specialist in coffee cultivation and within a short time he brought the institute international recognition. It soon became the focus of botanical and agricultural research for colonial powers in Africa. Here, fertilization research was carried out in demarcated areas. Plant physiology, entomology, plant toxicology and the possibility of pest control were all part of the Imperial Institute's field of work, as was research into cultivation methods and local plant remedies. All microscopes in the institute came from Carl Zeiss in Jena, and glassware was preferred from Lauscha. Lists of the then modern laboratory equipment are still in the National Archives of Tanzania, in Dar es Salaam.

Amani was to become the largest arboretum in the world. Species were introduced from various parts of the world for agricultural trials with varied economic interests, such as medicinal plants (i.e. Cinchona spp.), fruits and spices (e.g. Garcinia spp.), valuable timber (e.g. Cedrela, Eucalyptus), cosmetics (i.e. Cananga), rubber, fibre, oil (e.g. Hevea) and ornamental plants (e.g. fan palms).

In 1914 the Amani library stocked almost 4,000 books and 300 journals. Much of the literature and numerous specimens held at Amani were brought to Berlin in 1918, but in 1943, the Berlin herbarium was hit by a bomb and the material was destroyed.

Medical Contributions

One of the most famous visitors to Amani was Robert Koch, the famous pathlogist, Professor of Hygiene at the University of Berlin, and Director of the newly established Institute of Hygiene (German Hygienischen Institut) and from 1891 director of the Institute for Infectious diseases (German: Instituts für Infektionskrankheiten)
He participated in the ongoing intensive research being carried out at the Institute, and showed that the seasonal incidence of malaria was highest during the Great Rains when, 'for a whole month masses of water lie on much of the land', thus confirming the Kiswahili saying, Hakuna masika yasiyo mbu'' ('There are no rains without mosquitos'). He also demonstrated an incubation period of 12 days for the illness. The elevation of the Usambara mountains was to prove crucial in his observation of the absence of malaria above an altitude of 1,300 metres. In December, 1904, Koch was sent to German East Africa to study East Coast fever of cattle and he made important observations, not only on this disease, but also on pathogenic species of Babesia and Trypanosoma and on tickborne spirochaetosis, continuing his work on these organisms when he returned home. In 1905, he won the Nobel Prize for Physiology or Medicine "for his investigations and discoveries in relation to tuberculosis."

In 1906/7 Robert Koch and his team stayed in Amani, and later made an expedition to Uganda as part of their research into African sleeping sickness African trypanosomiasis. The western area of  Tanganyika, in particular near the lakes, had been suffering from an 'epidemic' of sleeping sickness, an illness which also ravaged neighbouring Uganda. Large outbreaks of this disease had occurred in East Africa at the turn of the century (1896 -1910), and it was widely held that these were epidemics imported from West Africa or the Congo, rather than being endemic to the region. The first published description of sleeping sickness cases during the 1900-1920 'epidemic', in the British Protectorate of East Africa, now Uganda, was made at the Church Missionary Society (CMS) Hospital at Mengo in 1901. Thus it was that David Bruce and his wife reached Entebbe in March 1903, with David Nunes Nabarro. Koch came again in 1906-7, to test the drug atoxyl. Atoxyl was so named by Antoine Béchamp, who synthesised it in 1859 by reacting aniline with arsenic acid, to denote its lesser toxicity when compared to arsenic. In 1906, Paul Ehrlich(1854-1915) and Alfred Bertheim(1879-1914) had discovered the structural formula of atoxyl and Ehrlich's ' magic bullet' had raised the possibility of targeted therapy. Koch's methods have recently raised ethical questions about his trials of atoxyl, since the drug had serious side-effects, including blindness. 

Although the Amani Research Institute became world-famous during German colonial rule as a scientific research centre, it retained its international reputation after the British received control of the territory.

Role in World War I
During World War I, the Amani Research Institute reinforced its international reputation in research when scientists at the centre developed various products. These included medicine and chemical products, from local material to meet war needs and those of the German settlers at a time when the colony was cut off from the rest of the world and could not import anything:
"Considerable ingenuity was shown in producing in the colony manufactured goods and medical supplies normally imported from Europe. Quinine was made at the Amani Institute and at Mpwapwa....Dye-stuffs were made from native barks. In the first eighteen months of the war the Amani Agricultural Research Institute 'prepared for use from its own products 16 varieties of foodstuffs and liquors, 11 varieties of spices, 12 varieties of medicines and medicaments, 5 varieties of rubber products, 2 of soap, oils and candles, 3 of materials used in making boats, and 10 miscellaneous substances. Many of these were prepared in comparatively large quantities, e.g.15,200 bottles of whisky and other alcoholic liquors, 10,252 lb. of chocolate and cocoa, 2,652 parcels of toothpowder, 10,000 pieces of soap, 300 bottles of castor oil etc.'

Post World War I activities

Following the German defeat in World War I, the British took over the administration of Tanganyika, first as mandated by the League of Nations and later as a United Nations trust territory. Although the Amani Research Institute became world-famous during German colonial rule as a scientific research centre, it retained its international reputation after the British received control of the colony. They were "impressed both with Amani's international reputation and the quality of research conducted there and continued operating it as a research institute under the British postwar government. 

The East Africa Commission founded in 1924 was, however, justifiably critical of the neglect of this fine institution when it reported that "this world-famous research institution is, for all practical purposes, lying derelict, its laboratories unoccupied, its costly apparatus dismantled, the living quarters deteriorating, the magnificent and priceless collection of books and scientific records and specimens unused."

Eventually this led to the institution being under the charge of the East Africa Community some fifty years later in a co-operative manner.

For malarial research, the institute was transformed in 1949 into the East African Malaria Unit. The research centre served not only Tanganyika but also Kenya, Uganda, Zanzibar and British Somaliland in the prevention and control of malaria and other vector-borne diseases. It became the East African Malaria Institute in 1951 and was renamed the East African Institute of Malaria and Vector Borne Diseases in 1954.

Post-independence

After British colonial rule ended, the institute continued to play an important role as a research centre in Tanzania. 
In 1964, liberated Tanganyika united with Zanzibar to form the independent nation of Tanzania. 
In 1977, it was renamed Amani Medical Research Centre of the National Institute for Medical Research, covering a wide range of areas in medical research.

Present day

The Amani Botanical Garden now has an official area of 244 hectares. Most is occupied by the National Institute for Medical Research (NIMR) – but the remainder is unofficially occupied. The Botanical Garden has been subject to encroachment by human activities, mainly around Amani village, where part of NIMR is located. The Amani Botanical Garden therefore has several bodies responsible for its management – the Ministry of Agriculture, the Tanzania Forestry Research Institute (TAFORI) and the NIMR. Its library is partly located in the University of Dar es Salaam, with which the institute cooperates closely. Practically nothing is left of the old cinchona tree plantations, which were almost completely destroyed in the mid to late 1960s. 

Around 3000 different species were still to be found in and around Amani in 2007. Today many of these botanical plots are derelict and show reclamation by native species. Alien species introduced by the Botanical Garden are a major conservation issue for the adjoining Amani Nature Reserve.

Other literature

 Julius Schwalbe, Georg Gaffky, Eduard Pfuhl (Hrsg.): Robert Koch. Gesammelte Werke. 3 Bände. Leipzig 1912:
Band 1, Archive, https://archive.org/details/b21463608_0001
Band 2-1, Archive, https://archive.org/details/b21353207_0001
Band 2-2, Archive. https://archive.org/details/b21353207_0002
Pürschel-Trostberg: The agricultural advance of Amani-Institute during German colonial time. National Archive of Tansania, Dar es Salaam 2001.
 Management Plan for the Botanical Research Institute at Amani ( Memento from December 26, 2015 in the web archive archive.today ). online at www.kew.org (English) https://archive.today/20130213005408/http://www.kew.org/conservation/cpdu/amani2.html

See also

References

 

Medical research institutes in Tanzania
Buildings and structures in the Tanga Region
History of German East Africa
History of Tanganyika
Research institutes established in 1902